Ouimette is a surname, derived from the surname Ouimet. Notable people with it include:

 Gerard Ouimette (1940–2015), American mobster and author
 Karl Ouimette (born 1992), Canadian professional soccer player
 Stephen Ouimette (born 1954), Canadian actor and director
 Steve Ouimette (born 1968), rock guitarist

See also
 Ouimet, a surname